Galgaï-Yurt was a village that was located in modern day Valerik in the Chechen Republic, Russia. It was destroyed in 1833 after punitive expediton of Russian Empire during the Caucasian War.

Etymology 
Galgaï-Yurt is a composition of two words — Ghalghaï, which is the self-name of Ingush people and Yurt, which means village in Vainakh languages. The word literally translates from Ingush language as village of Ghalghaï.

History 
In 7 November of 1833, Major General of the Russian Imperial Army, Engelgardt A. G. led an punitive expediton to the un-ruly village Galgaï-Yurt which ended successfully for the Russian Empire. The village was wiped out in 1833, after another punitive expediton of Russian Empire, led by baron Rozen. In 1847, head of the Achkhoevsky garrison lieutenant colonel Preobrazhenskiy led an punitive expediton to Galgaï-Yurt to punish the villagers for their un-ruliness which ended as a success for the Russian Empire. The village was mentioned in map of Little Chechnya and Vladikavkazskiy Okrug in 1848 where it was mentioned as inhabited.

References

Bibliography 
 
 

Chechnya